Stowaway is a 1978 Soviet comedy film directed by Yuri Pobedonostsev.

Plot 
Ninka meets Anton, with whom she goes to the BAM construction site, but forgets to buy a ticket.

Cast 
 Tatyana Dogileva as Ninka
 Konstantin Kravinsky as Anton
 Amurbek Gobashiyev
 Tigran Davydov
 Olga Torban
 Natalya Khorokhorina
 Marina Shigaryova
 Mikhail Bychkov
 Yuriy Chigrov
 Vyacheslav Gostinsky

References

External links 
 
 

1978 films
1970s Russian-language films
1970s teen comedy films
1978 comedy films
Soviet teen comedy films